The Central American Games football tournament is a football competition organized by UNCAF and ORDECA. It is scheduled to be held every four years.

The men's tournament is only open to players who are aged 20 and below.

In 2001 a women's tournament was played for the first time. The women's event is contested by the senior national squads.

Results

Men's tournament results

Women's tournament results

Medal count

Men's

Women's

All-time performance
 Men's tournament, 1973–2017

See also
 Football at the Pan American Games
 Football at the Central American and Caribbean Games
 Futsal at the Central American Games

External links
 RSSSF.com - Juegos Centroamericanos

 
International association football competitions in Central America
Football at multi-sport events